Lindisfarne College is a state-integrated Presbyterian boys' day and boarding intermediate and high school in Hastings, New Zealand. The school is named after the Holy Isle of Lindisfarne, site of the medieval Celtic monastery and castle on the northeastern coast of England. The college was established on 14 April 1953, by the Herrick family. The founding roll of 33 students now comprises around 500 students. Roughly half the school students are full or weekly boarders. Its sister school, Iona College for girls, is situated in nearby Havelock North.

Since 2000, the college has invested significantly in major renovation and new construction projects. Older buildings such as the homestead, dining hall, chapel, gymnasium, and music department have been modernised, and new facilities include the Lowe Family Performing Arts Centre.

The current rector is Mr. Stuart Hakeney. The college's overarching philosophy is based on 'four cornerstones of learning' — academic excellence, cultural participation, sporting endeavour, and the Christian dimension. It focuses heavily on producing alumni with 'admirable' content of character, through its 'Good Man' programme.

Scottish Heritage
Lindisfarne places a major emphasis on its Scottish and Presbyterian heritage. This tradition began in accordance with the wishes of the Herrick family, who gifted the land on which the college stands for the creation of a school in 1953. Additionally, the college's founding rector, Rev. F. H. Robertson, was a prominent minister in the Presbyterian Church of Aotearoa New Zealand, and established a uniquely Presbyterian and Scottish dimension to the college. The college hosts an annual Burns supper, maintains an active pipe band, and hosts the annual Easter Highland Games for the Hawke's Bay region. The college's formal uniform includes the wearing of tartan kilts, and its social studies curriculum includes the mandatory learning of the school's Celtic heritage. Students are also required to learn the college hymn, the college song, and the college prayer.

College Grounds

Campus
Lindisfarne is situated on two separate sites in the suburb of Frimley, in Hastings. The main college campus is on 8 hectares, while a further 9 hectares is located nearby and divided into two sports venues called "The Farne" and "Ranui Fields." The campus is centered around the original Herrick Family homestead, a three-storeyed late-19th Century farmhouse that has been substantially renovated to house the college's administration offices. The homestead adjoins an old tennis court area that has since evolved into the "Homestead Lawn." The lawn provides the central feature of the college's gardens, edged by flower beds, native ferns, English trees and a stream. The boarding residences are also situated on the main campus, and are organised into year groups. A number of private residences are also situated on the college campus and house the rector, the deputy rector, the chaplain, and the boarding masters.

Dibble Sculptures

The college grounds are also home to three major works by renowned New Zealand sculptor Paul Dibble. The first sculpture, commissioned by the College Foundation in 2000, is a representation of the college's dual heritage, bearing engravings of the Celtic cross and per saltire Cross of St. Andrew along with iconic Māori patterns. The second sculpture, commissioned in 2007, depicts a fish set below a bronze replica of the ruins of the medieval Lindisfarne Priory at Holy Isle. The most recent sculpture consists of a seven piece representation of the changing seasons, at the centre of which is a large heart — a reference to the college's motto 'Highways in the Heart' — engraved with the names of artists such as Ludwig van Beethoven, Banksy, and Māori artist Ralph Hotere.

Te Whāiti-Nui-A-Toi Programme 
Lindisfarne has also developed a strong Māori cultural dimension since the establishment of the Te Whāiti-Nui-A-Toi Scholarship in 1972. The scholarship, which has historical connections to the Māori Synod through the work of Presbyterian Missionaries to the Ngāi Tūhoe people of the Te Urewera region, provides funding support for Māori boys attending the college. Te Whāiti-Nui-A-Toi scholars have also represented Lindisfarne at major cultural events, such as the Hawke's Bay Secondary Schools Cultural Festival and the Manu Korero speech competition. Sir Rodney Gallon served as de facto patron of the Te Whāiti-Nui-A-Toi scholarship programme from 1972 until his death in 2012. All students are required to learn a haka of the local Ngāti Kahungunu iwi, which is performed at various sports and cultural events.

Joint Activities & Exchanges 
Lindisfarne is located adjacent to Hastings Girls' High School, with which it has numerous joint musical ensembles, notably the Concord Symphonic Band. The college also produces annual theatrical productions, in conjunction with either Hastings Girls' High School, Iona College, or Woodford House. Lindisfarne has also had long-standing associations with Turakina Maori Girls' College and St Joseph's Māori Girls' College through the kapa haka activities of Te Whāiti-Nui-A-Toi Scholars attending the college.

Annual sporting exchanges have been established between Lindisfarne and other Scottish-heritage boys' schools in New Zealand, including Scots College, Wellington, and Saint Kentigern College, Auckland. Additional sporting rivalries exist between Lindisfarne and Rathkeale College, Wanganui Collegiate School, and Napier Boys' High School.

Houses

Lindisfarne has an established house system with four houses: Aidan, Cuthbert, Oswald, and Durham. Boys whose fathers are alumni of the school are placed in the same house that their father was in. Brothers are usually placed in the same house as well, to create a sense of family within houses. Students participate in various inter-house activities during the course of the year, with the ultimate goal of winning the Gahan Shield.

Each house is named after an aspect of the college's Celtic heritage:

 Aidan - (Red)
It is named after St. Aidan of Lindisfarne, founder of the monastery on the Holy Isle.
 Cuthbert - (Black)
It is named after St. Cuthbert, Bishop of Lindisfarne (685-687).
 Oswald - (Blue)
It is named after St. Oswald, King of Northumbria (634-642).
 Durham  - (Green)
It is named after the Bishopric of Durham, in the cathedral of which the remains of King Oswald and St. Cuthbert are interred.

Funding 
In January 2016 it was reported that Lindisfarne receives an annual average of $4000 per student in private donations, the highest of any state-integrated school in New Zealand. Between the period 2000-2020 the college received a total of $22,345,987 in private donations.

As of 2017 the college reportedly charges $12650 per year for day students. Although this includes several voluntary components, the charges are bundled together as "consolidated fees."

College Rectors and Roll
1953-1954 — Reverend F. H. Robertson
1955-1956 — P. H. G. Southwell
1956-1959 — J. W. Scougall
1959-1970 — A. C. Francis
1970-1978 — J. H. N. Pine
1978-1980 — P. M. Hill
1980-2000 — W. G. Smith
2000-2009 — G. W. Lander
2010-2020 — K. MacLeod
2020-current — S. Hakeney

Notable alumni

Arts & Culture 

 Martin Campbell — Film and TV director. Best known for directing Bond movies GoldenEye (1995) and Casino Royale (2006). He also directed The Mask of Zorro (1998), The Legend of Zorro (2005), and Green Lantern (2011).

Politics
 John Falloon — National MP (1977 — 1996), Cabinet Minister.

Civics 
 Hon. Justice Joseph Williams — High Court Judge and former Chief Judge of the Māori Land Court.

Sport
 Mick Duncan — All Black (1971)
 Campbell Johnstone — All Black (2005)
 Tiaan Falcon - Rugby union player for Toyota Verblitz (2020-)
 Duane Kale ONZM — Winner of four gold, one silver, and one bronze medal in swimming at the 1996 Atlanta Paralympic Games. Chef de Mission for New Zealand at the 2008 Beijing Paralympic Games and the 2012 London Paralympic Games. Member of the International Paralympic Committee.
 John Timu — All Black (1988-94) and played for the New Zealand Rugby League team (1995-1997)
 Taine Randell — All Black (1997-2002), All Black Captain (1998-1999)
 Israel Dagg — All Black (2010-2017)
Laurent Simutoga — Rugby union prop who played for Paris (2007-2009) and La Rochelle (2010-2011) in the French Top 14.
Hugh Renton — Super Rugby player for the Hurricanes (2017) and Highlanders (2021-)
Matthew Gould — Goalkeeper for Altrincham F.C. in the National League (2020-)
George Bridge — All Black (2018-)
Tom Mackintosh - Gold medalist in Men's Rowing eight 2020 summer olympics, University level rugby (2014-2015)

Academia
Robert M. Carter — Professor of Earth Sciences at James Cook University (1981-1988).

References

External links
Lindisfarne College official website

Boys' schools in New Zealand
Educational institutions established in 1953
Secondary schools in the Hawke's Bay Region
Schools in Hastings, New Zealand
1953 establishments in New Zealand
Boarding schools in New Zealand